Politics of Georgia may refer to:
Politics of Georgia (country)
Politics of Georgia (U.S. state)